Randolph Baer Cohen (born in Philadelphia, Pennsylvania) is an American  financial economist and MBA Class of 1975 Senior Lecturer of Entrepreneurial Management at Harvard Business School.

Career
At Harvard, Cohen teaches Field X  and Field Y, entrepreneurship classes designed to enable students to develop and grow their businesses.

Cohen has helped to start and grow a number of investment management firms, and has served as a consultant to others. He is a partner at Exsight Capital Management LLC, a venture capital firm specializing in early-stage impact investments in innovative ophthalmic diagnostic and treatment solutions.

Cohen spoke at Hedge Fund Management(2007) hosted by Stanford CFA Institute.

Cohen was diagnosed with Retinitis Pigmentosa, a genetic disorder of the eyes that causes loss of vision. Cohen had bad eyesight in his childhood, but was able to get by using aids. However, his eyesight has declined since then. In the final year of his PhD program, Cohen started to have trouble reading books. In his 50s, Cohen became legally blind.

Cohen is on the board of the Massachusetts Association for the Blind and Visually Impaired(MABVI), with which he collaborates to produce the podcast Dangerous Vision. On the podcast, Cohen invites people who have low vision or related to people with low vision to share how they navigate through their lives. Cohen also created a Dangerous Vision website to share his experience with vision loss more widely.

Personal
Cohen grew up in Philadelphia and attended Germantown Academy in Fort Washington, Pennsylvania. His father was a practicing attorney and his mother taught reading at Wordsworth Academy, a school for children with learning disabilities. During graduate school he appeared on the television show Jeopardy! on an episode that aired January 29, 1997.

Cohen writes about professional basketball for the SB Nation Philadelphia 76ers fan site LibertyBallers  under the name blindloyalty76. One of his most widely read pieces is "Robert Covington: top 30 NBA Player?".

Research
Cohen has been published in several journals in the fields of finance and economics. In addition, Cohen has published numerous Harvard case studies on topics ranging from the valuation of baseball star Alex Rodriguez to risk arbitrage. His 2003 research entitled "The value spread" (with Christopher Polk and Tuomo Vuolteenaho) was a nominee for the Smith-Breeden Prize Prize for the best paper published in the Journal of Finance. His 2005 research entitled "Judging fund managers by the company they keep" (with Lubos Pastor and Joshua Coval), which was profiled in Time magazine (June 9, 2003), The New York Times (January 5, 2003), and Barron's Magazine (December 16–20, 2002), was also nominated for the Smith-Breeden Prize.

Papers
Cohen is the co-author of the following most cited papers, ranked from most to least cited.

References

External links
Cohen at SSRN

1965 births
Living people
Scientists from Philadelphia
Jewish American scientists
Harvard Business School faculty
Harvard College alumni
Jeopardy! contestants
University of Chicago Booth School of Business alumni
MIT Sloan School of Management faculty
Germantown Academy alumni
Economists from Pennsylvania
21st-century American economists
21st-century American Jews